Nicolaes Gillis (1595, Antwerp – 1632, Haarlem), was a Dutch Golden Age still life painter.

Biography
According to the RKD he is known for fruit and flower still lifes and is known as one of the first few painters of the banketje, or "breakfast still life". He was influenced by Floris van Dyck. He married in Haarlem in 1615 and is documented there up to 1632.

References

1595 births
1632 deaths
Dutch Golden Age painters
Dutch male painters
Artists from Antwerp
Dutch still life painters
Artists from Haarlem